The 2009 Dunlop British Open Championships was held at the National Squash Centre from 8–14 September 2009. Nick Matthew won his second British Open title by defeating James Willstrop in the final. This was the first all English final since the pre-war challenge system.

Seeds

Draw and results

Main draw

References

Men's British Open Squash Championships
Squash in England
Men's British Open
Men's British Open
Men's British Open
2000s in Manchester
Sports competitions in Manchester